is an administrative part of the town of Matsuzaki, Shizuoka Prefecture, on the west coast of Izu Peninsula, Japan. It has been dubbed the "Izu Côte d'Azur" or "Japanese Côte d'Azur" for its scenic shoreline and the orange roofs of many of its houses.

Iwachi is known for its beach and onsen hot springs.

References

External links
Iwachi Tourist Association website 

Populated coastal places in Japan